Lace and Whiskey is the third solo and tenth overall studio album by American rock singer Alice Cooper, released on April 29, 1977 by Warner Bros. Records.

Background
After many years of portraying a dark and sinister persona Alice Cooper decided to try something new and donned the persona of a heavy drinking comic PI named "Maurice Escargot" — a fictional character in the same vein as Inspector Clouseau. Cooper is pictured as Escargot on the back cover of Lace and Whiskey, which was still a rock-based album but was stylistically influenced by Cooper's love for 1940s' and 1950s' movies and music. The album only peaked at No. 42 in the US and No. 33 in the UK Albums Chart.

The album's lead single, "You and Me", was an easy listening ballad which provided Cooper with his last US top-ten single for twelve years. “(No More) Love at Your Convenience”, a disco-inspired pop song, was released as the second single — it did not chart in most countries. Music videos were created for both songs, at a time well before the advent of MTV. The song "King of the Silver Screen" features a sampling of the main motif of the "Battle Hymn of the Republic".

Cooper's King of the Silver Screen tour in support of this album, featured a stage set designed as a giant TV, with its slit screen allowing Cooper and his dancers to jump into and out of it along to filmed choreographed sequences during songs, and had comedic mock commercials screened in between some songs. The tour only ran in the US and Canada, throughout the summers of 1977 and 1978, and for 1978 would be renamed the School’s Out for Summer tour. Filmed highlights from the opening night of the 1977 tour, capturing a very inebriated Cooper, were featured in the Alice Cooper and Friends TV special. The tour's Las Vegas concerts were recorded, resulting in the live album The Alice Cooper Show (1977). With the exception of “It’s Hot Tonight”, which was a regular part of setlists on the following Madhouse Rocks, the 2001 Brutal Planet and the 2008–2009 Psychodrama tours, and "Road Rats" which was a regular during the 1980 Flush the Fashion tour, nothing from Lace and Whiskey has been performed since the close of the School’s Out for Summer ‘78 tour. "Damned If You Do", "Ubangi Stomp", "(No More) Love at Your Convenience", "I Never Wrote Those Songs", and "My God" have never been played live by Cooper.

It was after the completion of the 1977 tour, that Cooper checked into a New York-based sanitarium for his first treatment for alcoholism.

During the initial stage of this album's era, when it was clear that Cooper was not going to return from his new success, original Alice Cooper group members Dennis Dunaway, Neal Smith, and Michael Bruce formed a new band with Mike Marconi and Bob Dolin called "The Billion Dollar Babies". Michael Bruce sang their lead vocals.

Lace and Whiskey was digitally remastered and re-released on CD by Metal Blade Records in 1990.

The opening song "It's Hot Tonight" would later be sampled by the rap rock group Beastie Boys for the song "What Comes Around" on their second studio album Paul's Boutique (1989).

Track listing

Personnel
Credits are adapted from the Lace and Whiskey liner notes.

 Alice Cooper — vocals
 Dick Wagner — guitar, vocals
 Steve Hunter — guitar
 Bob Babbitt — bass guitar
 Allan Schwartzberg — drums

Additional personnel
 Prakash John — bass guitar on "Road Rats"
 Tony Levin — bass guitar on "Lace and Whisky", "Damned If You Do" and "Ubangi Stomp"
 Jim Gordon — drums on "Road Rats", "Damned If You Do" and "You and Me"
 Jimmy Maelen — percussion
 Al Kooper — piano on "Damned If You Do"
 Allan Macmillan - piano on "I Never Wrote Those Songs"
 Josef Chirowski — keyboards
 Bob Ezrin — keyboards, vocals
 Ernie Watts - tenor saxophone, clarinet 
 Julia Tillman, Lorna Willard, Venetta Fields - vocals on "(No More) Love at Your Convenience"
 The California Boys' Choir - choir
 Douglas Neslund - choir master

Charts

Certifications

References

External links
 

Alice Cooper albums
1977 albums
Albums produced by Bob Ezrin
Warner Records albums